Brendon Winslow (born 30 August 1969) is a New Zealand rugby player of Croatian descent.

Brendon Ricky Winslow was born in Henderson, Auckland, New Zealand. His family lineage is through Jelavic and Srhoj families. Winslow coached Rugby Club Nada in Split, Croatia from 1995 through to 1998. Winslow was the first New Zealander of Croatian descent to play rugby for Croatia. He first played for Croatia in 1995 (against Luxembourg) and his final test match was in 2004. Winslow currently resides in Queensland, Australia and is the Croatian rugby scout for Australia.

References

1969 births
Living people
New Zealand rugby union players
Croatian rugby union players
Rugby union players from Auckland
New Zealand people of Croatian descent
New Zealand expatriate sportspeople in Croatia
New Zealand emigrants to Australia